The Journal of Contemporary Asia is a peer-reviewed academic journal covering Asian studies. It was established in 1970 and is published 5 times a year by Routledge. The editor-in-chief is Kevin Hewison (University of North Carolina at Chapel Hill). Previous editors were Malcolm Caldwell, Jonathan Fast, Bruce McFarlane and Peter Limqueco.

Abstracting and indexing
The journal is abstracted and indexed in:

According to the Journal Citation Reports, the journal has a 2021 impact factor of 1.882.

References

External links

Routledge academic journals
Asian studies journals
Publications established in 1970
English-language journals
5 times per year journals